The Indian general election, 2009 in West Bengal were held for 42 seats with the state going to polls in the last three phases of the general elections. There was pre-poll alliance in the state between the Indian National Congress and the Trinamool Congress against the Left Front. Indian National Congress contested on 14 seats across the state whereas the Trinamool Congress contested on 27 seats and SUCI(C) contested one seat. The alliance was largely successful as the Trinamool Congress, the Congress and the SUCI(C) won 19, 6 and 1 seat respectively, dislodging the Left Front, which won only 15 seats out of 42.

Alliance wise result

Elected MPs

Analysis

Assembly segments wise lead of Parties

Postal Ballot wise lead of Parties

See also
2011 West Bengal Legislative Assembly election 
2006 West Bengal Legislative Assembly election

References

Indian general elections in West Bengal
2000s in West Bengal
W